Get Dirty Radio is the second solo studio album by American rapper A.G. of Diggin' in the Crates Crew. It was released on October 31, 2006 through Look Records. Recording sessions took place at Handclap Studios in San Francisco, except for the song "We Don't Care", which was recorded in The Bronx. Production was handled by DJ Design, Madlib, Oh No, Tommy Tee, Cochise, Jake One, J Dilla, Lord Finesse and Showbiz. It features guest appearances from Aloe Blacc, Party Arty and Lil' Roze.

Track listing

Personnel
 Andre "A.G." Barnes – main artist, executive producer
 Arthur "Party Arty" Sheridan – featured artist (tracks: 3, 9)
 Egbert Nathaniel "Aloe Blacc" Dawkins III – featured artist (tracks: 3, 13)
 Lil' Roze – featured artist (track 6)
 Otis "Madlib" Jackson Jr. – producer (tracks: 1, 3)
 Jacob "Jake One" Dutton – producer (track 2)
 Keith "DJ Design" Griego – producer (tracks: 4, 7, 10, 15, 16), mixing, executive producer
 Tommy Flaaten – producer (tracks: 5, 9)
 Cochise – producer (track 6)
 Michael "Oh No" Jackson – producer (tracks: 8, 12)
 Robert "Lord Finesse" Hall – producer (track 11)
 James "J Dilla" Yancey – producer (track 13)
 Rodney "Showbiz" LeMay – producer (track 14)
 Dave Cooley – mastering
 Jeff Jank – design
 Pete Jones – photography

References

External links

2006 albums
Showbiz and A.G. albums
Albums produced by Madlib
Albums produced by J Dilla
Albums produced by Jake One
Albums produced by Lord Finesse
Albums produced by Oh No (musician)
Albums produced by Showbiz (producer)